A Fool is a 2014 Chinese adventure comedy-drama film directed by Chen Jianbin. It was released on November 20, 2015.  In the film, a goatherder is followed home by a mute, simple-minded man so he and his wife have to deal with the new situation while trying to get their son's prison sentence reduced.

Cast
Chen Jianbin
Jiang Qinqin
Wang Xuebing
Jin Shijia

Reception
The film grossed  on its opening weekend at the Chinese box office.

References

External links

2014 films
2014 comedy-drama films
Chinese comedy-drama films
2014 comedy films
2014 drama films